Boswell is a town in Grant Township, Benton County, Indiana, United States. The population was 778 at the 2010 census. It is part of the Lafayette, Indiana Metropolitan Statistical Area.

History
The town of Boswell was first laid out by Charles Moore, but Moore sold the land it occupied to Tippecanoe County-native Elizabeth H. Scott who, with her husband Charles, replatted it in its present form on July 18, 1872.  A small general store run from a "rough board shanty" just north of the railroad was the town's first business, but this was joined by many more as the town grew.  The town was named for Parnaham Boswell and was platted with streets bearing the names of the founders, Charles and Elizabeth, and their five children, Grace, Emma, Clinton, Harold and Jennie.

Geography
Boswell is located in Grant Township. U.S. Route 41 passes along the east side of Boswell; State Road 352 and the Kankakee, Beaverville and Southern Railroad both run east through town. Goose Creek flows along Boswell's south side and joins Mud Pine Creek about two miles to the southeast.

Government and public safety
The town's business is presided over by a three-person town board and a town clerk.  These positions are elected every four years.

The town of Boswell employees a full-time town marshal as well as a part-time deputy marshal.  The Marshal is charged with providing law enforcement service in the town limits and surrounding area.  The town marshal is a sworn police officer under Indiana statute.

Demographics

2010 census
As of the 2010 census, there were 778 people, 310 households, and 205 families living in the town. The racial makeup of the town was 87.9% White, 0.6% African American, 0.3% Native American, 0.1% Asian, 10.2% from other races, and 0.9% from two or more races. Hispanic or Latino of any race were 15.0% of the population.

There were 310 households, of which 33.2% had children under the age of 18 living with them, 47.4% were married couples living together, 13.5% had a female householder with no husband present, 5.2% had a male householder with no wife present, and 33.9% were non-families. 30.0% of all households were made up of individuals, and 16.1% had someone living alone who was 65 years of age or older. The average household size was 2.51 and the average family size was 3.08.

The median age in the town was 38.1 years. 27.6% of residents were under the age of 18; 5.9% were between the ages of 18 and 24; 28.3% were from 25 to 44; 22% were from 45 to 64; and 16.2% were 65 years of age or older. The gender makeup of the town was 47.9% male and 52.1% female.

2000 census
As of the 2000 census, there were 827 people, 329 households, and 224 families living in the town. The racial makeup of the town was 92.14% White, 0.24% African American, 0.24% Native American, 0.24% Asian, 4.84% from other races, and 2.30% from two or more races. Hispanic or Latino of any race were 9.79% of the population.

There were 329 households, out of which 31.3% had children under the age of 18 living with them, 54.1% were married couples living together, 10.6% had a female householder with no husband present, and 31.9% were non-families. 28.3% of all households were made up of individuals, and 17.6% had someone living alone who was 65 years of age or older. The average household size was 2.51 and the average family size was 3.08.

In the town, the population was spread out, with 28.7% under the age of 18, 6.4% from 18 to 24, 28.2% from 25 to 44, 16.7% from 45 to 64, and 20.1% who were 65 years of age or older. The median age was 36 years. For every 100 females, there were 85.0 males. For every 100 females age 18 and over, there were 81.0 males.

The median income for a household in the town was $33,224, and the median income for a family was $36,136. Males had a median income of $28,839 versus $19,792 for females. The per capita income for the town was $14,401. About 5.5% of families and 8.3% of the population were below the poverty line, including 7.2% of those under age 18 and 3.9% of those age 65 or over.

Education
The town has a lending library, the Boswell Public Library.

References

External links
 Town of Boswell official ebsite

Towns in Benton County, Indiana
Towns in Indiana
Populated places established in 1872
Lafayette metropolitan area, Indiana
1872 establishments in Indiana